Paul Drux (born 7 February 1995) is a German handball player for Füchse Berlin and the German national team.

He participated at the 2019 World Men's Handball Championship.

Achievements
Summer Olympics:
: 2016

References

External links

1995 births
Living people
German male handball players
People from Gummersbach
Sportspeople from Cologne (region)
Olympic handball players of Germany
Handball players at the 2016 Summer Olympics
Medalists at the 2016 Summer Olympics
Olympic bronze medalists for Germany
Olympic medalists in handball
Handball-Bundesliga players
Füchse Berlin Reinickendorf HBC players
Handball players at the 2020 Summer Olympics